Two Gates of Sleep is a 2010 American drama film written and directed by Alistair Banks Griffin and starring Brady Corbet, David Call and Karen Young.

Two Gates of Sleep was produced by Josh Mond and Andrew Renzi through the production company Borderline Films. The film premiered at the 2010 Cannes Film Festival in the Director’s Fortnight selection, went on to win the 2011 New Talent Grand PIX at CPH:PIX and was distributed in the US by Factory 25.

Plot
After preparing for their mother's imminent death, two brothers go on an arduous upriver journey to honor her final request.

Cast
Brady Corbet as Jack
David Call as Louis
Ross Francis as Hunter
Ritchie Montgomery as Dr. Benjamin
Lindsay Soileau as Dell
Karen Young as Bess

Reception
Robert Tumas of Slant Magazine awarded the film three stars out of four.

Accolades

References

External links
 
 

American drama films
2010 drama films
2010 films
2010s English-language films
2010s American films